Kommuri Pratap Reddy Institute of Technology (KPRIT) is a college in Ghatkesar, Telangana. It was founded by K Pratap Reddy in 2008. Sri K Pratap Reddy is a member of the Legislative assembly as well as an educationalist and philanthropist. Established in 2008, KPRIT is located on an area of 22 acre (40 ha) site adjacent to NTPC power grid near Ghanpur Village, Ghatkesar Mandal. KPRIT is just 9 kilometers (5.0 mi) from UPPAL bus depot and 1 km from the outer ring road. The institution is recognised by All India Council for Technical Education, New Delhi and affiliated to JNTUH.

Undergraduated Courses
 B.Tech. Electronics and Communication Engineering
 B. Tech. Electrical and Electronics Engineering
 B.Tech. Computer Science
 B.Tech. Civil Engineering
 B.Tech. Mechanical Engineering

External links

All India Council for Technical Education